Edward Daniel Skudder (born May 26, 1986) is an American director, producer, writer, animator, musician, and voice actor. He is known for being the showrunner and co-executive producer for the Cartoon Network animated series Unikitty!. He is also the creator of the animated web series Dick Figures and the co-director and co-writer of its Kickstarter-funded feature film Dick Figures: The Movie, done with his best friend and business partner Zack Keller, both of them voicing main characters Red and Blue respectively.

Early life
Skudder started his college years at the USC School of Cinematic Arts to study Cinematography and Film/Video Production from 2005 to 2008.

Career
Skudder started his career as an animator at the animation studio, 6 Point Harness. While he was working on different projects, he was co-developing a web series for Mondo Media with Zack Keller called Dick Figures. When the first episode was released on YouTube, it was a massive success and it eventually became the most viewed web series on YouTube. Skudder and Keller then started to make 49 more episodes. Skudder also voiced Red, Raccoon, and Mr. Dingleberry in Dick Figures. It was doing so well that Ed and Zack both created a Kickstarter to fund the feature-length film, Dick Figures: The Movie (the first feature-length animated production by Mondo Media and 6 Point Harness). It was known for being one of the most popular animated projects being funded through Kickstarter at that time.

After Dick Figures ended in 2015, Skudder went on to work on Disney Television Animation's Pickle and Peanut, as a writer for one episode and as a storyboard artist for two episodes of the show. After that, Skudder worked as a creative director in animation at GoldieBlox.

After working at GoldieBlox, he co-created two animated mini web series with Lynn Wang in 2015 for Spindo TV called Kicko Puncho Rhino and Power Gloves which were both premiered on YouTube. After the two web series ended, Skudder worked at Nickelodeon where he co-created, co-directed, and co-written the short film, Space Mission: Danger with Lynn Wang for the 2015 Nickelodeon Animated Shorts Program.

In 2017, Skudder was brought in to work with Warner Bros. Animation as a writer, director, and storyboard artist for an episode of Teen Titans Go!, and The Lego Group with Lynn Wang to co-develop the Cartoon Network animated series Unikitty!. They both worked as producers for seasons 1 and 2, then co-executive producers for the third season. Skudder was also a singer and songwriter for a couple of songs in the show.

As of September 2019, Skudder is currently the head of story on the upcoming Illumination film The Super Mario Bros. Movie. He also made prop and EFX designs for The Cuphead Show! as well as freelance storyboards for an unannounced film for Netflix.

Filmography

Feature films

Short films

Television

References

External links
 
 

Living people
Animators from California
American animated film producers
American screenwriters
American television producers
American male voice actors
1986 births